Toghrol Al Jerd may refer to:
Toghrol Al Jerd District
Toghrol Al Jerd Rural District